Budha Dal Public School is a higher-secondary co-education private school in the Patiala city of Punjab, India. The school was founded in 1979 and is affiliated to the Central Board of Secondary Education since 2014.

References

External links 

Co-educational schools in India
High schools and secondary schools in Patiala
Educational institutions established in 1979
1979 establishments in Punjab, India